The 1950–51 British Ice Hockey season featured the English National League and Scottish National League.

English National League

English Autumn Cup

Results

Scottish National League

Regular season

Playoffs
Semifinals
Paisley Pirates - Dunfermline Vikings 17:5 on aggregate (4:4, 13:1)
Falkirk Lions - Perth Panthers 10:6 on aggregate (6:2, 4:4)
Final
Paisley Pirates - Falkirk Lions 7:3 on aggregate (1:1, 6:2)

Scottish Autumn Cup

Results

Final
Ayr and Fife played a tiebreaker series as they finished level on points and it had previously been decided that goal difference wouldn't count in such a situation. As a result, the two teams played a two-game total goal tiebreaker series. The first two games were completed with the teams finishing level on points, so another two games were arranged to decide a winner.
Ayr Raiders - Fife Flyers 7:2, 1:6, (tied 8:8 on aggregate)
Replay
Ayr Raiders - Fife Flyers 7:3, 4:11 (11:14 on aggregate)

Scottish Cup

Results
First round
Fife Flyers - Ayr Raiders 14:2 on aggregate (7:1, 7:1)
Dunfermline Vikings - Dundee Tigers 9:10 on aggregate (7:2, 2:8)
Paisley Pirates - Perth Panthers 14:3 on aggregate (6:3, 8:0)
Semifinals
Paisley Pirates - Dundee Tigers 12:9 on aggregate (4:4, 8:5)
Fife Flyers - Falkirk Lions 16:6 on aggregate (10:2, 6:4)
Final
Paisley Pirates - Fife Flyers 6:3, 6:8 2OT (1:2, 2:4, 1:1 - as the series was now tied on aggregate, overtime was played - 1:1, 1:0)

Canada Cup

Results

References 

British
1950 in English sport
1951 in English sport
1950–51 in British ice hockey
1950 in Scottish sport
1951 in Scottish sport